Oreste Capuzzo (7 December 1908 – 5 December 1985) was an Italian gymnast. He was born in Rivarolo and died in Genoa. He began competing in Milan in 1920. He won gold in the vault in the 1932 Summer Olympics in Los Angeles. He also competed in the 1936 Summer Olympics in Berlin. Capuzzo also took part in the 1934 World Championships in Budapest.

References
Oreste Capuzzo's profile at Sports Reference

1908 births
1985 deaths
Italian male artistic gymnasts
Gymnasts at the 1932 Summer Olympics
Gymnasts at the 1936 Summer Olympics
Olympic gymnasts of Italy
Olympic gold medalists for Italy
Olympic medalists in gymnastics
Medalists at the 1932 Summer Olympics
People from Rivarolo Ligure